The Spanish transition to democracy, known in Spain as la Transición ("the Transition") or la Transición española ("the Spanish Transition"), is a period of modern Spanish history encompassing the regime change that moved from the Francoist dictatorship to the consolidation of a parliamentary system, in the form of constitutional monarchy under Juan Carlos I.

According to scholars, the democratization process began after the death of the dictator Francisco Franco, in November 1975. Historians disagree on the exact date the transition was completed: some say it ended after the 1977 general election, while others place it later, when the 1978 Constitution was approved. Others suggest it ended with the failure of the 1981 attempted coup d'état. At its latest, the Transition is said to have ended with the first peaceful transfer of executive power, after the victory of the Spanish Socialist Workers' Party (PSOE) in the 1982 general election.

While often cited as a paradigm of peaceful, negotiated transition, political violence during the Spanish transition was far more prevalent than during the analogous democratization processes in Greece or Portugal, with the emergence of separatist, revolutionary, fascist and vigilante terrorist groups.

Political role of Juan Carlos I 

General Francisco Franco came to power in 1939, following the Spanish Civil War (1936–1939), and ruled as a dictator until his death in 1975. In 1969, he designated Prince Juan Carlos, grandson of Spain's most recent king, Alfonso XIII, as his official successor. For the next six years, Prince Juan Carlos initially remained in the background during public appearances and seemed ready to follow in Franco's footsteps. Once in power as King of Spain, however, he facilitated the development of a constitutional monarchy as his father, Don Juan de Borbón, had advocated since 1946.

The transition was an ambitious plan that counted on ample support both within and outside of Spain. Western governments, headed by the United States, now favoured a Spanish constitutional monarchy, as did many Spanish and international liberal capitalists.

Nevertheless, the transition proved challenging, as the spectre of the Civil War still haunted Spain. Francoists on the far right enjoyed considerable support within the Spanish Army, and people of the left distrusted a king who owed his position to Franco. For the transition to succeed, the army needed to refrain from intervening in the political process on behalf of Francoist elements within the existing government, while the leftist opposition needed to restrain its own most radical elements from provocation.

King Juan Carlos I began his reign as head of state without leaving the confines of Franco's legal system. As such, he swore fidelity to the Principles of the Movimiento Nacional (National Movement), the political system of the Franco era; took possession of the crown before the Francoist Cortes Españolas; and respected the Organic Law of the State for the appointment of his first head of government. Only in his speech before the Cortes did he indicate his support for a transformation of the Spanish political system.

The government of Carlos Arias Navarro (November 1975 – July 1976) 

The King did not initially appoint a new prime minister, leaving in place the incumbent head of government under Franco, Carlos Arias Navarro. Arias Navarro had not initially planned a reform of the Francoist regime; in the National Council of the Movement, an advisory assembly of the ruling FET y de las JONS (Falange) party and other groups in the Movimiento Nacional, he declared that the purpose of his government was the continuity of Francoism through a "democracy in the Spanish way". He believed political changes should be limited: he would give the parliament, the Cortes Españolas, the task of "updating our laws and institutions the way Franco would have wanted".

The reform programme adopted by the government was the one proposed by Manuel Fraga, rejecting Antonio Garrigues' plan to elect a constituent assembly. Fraga's programme aimed to achieve a "liberal democracy" that was "comparable to the rest of the Western European countries" through a "gradual and controlled process", through a series of reforms of the pseudo-constitutional Fundamental Laws of the Realm. This is why his proposal was dubbed as a "reform in the continuity", and his support came mostly from those who defended a Francoist sociological model.

It also had to garner support within the Armed Forces and in the Spanish Labour Organisation. It also needed to appease the democratic opposition to Francoism. The approach towards the dissenters was that they would not be part of the reform process, but would be allowed to participate in politics more generally, with the exception of the Communist Party of Spain (PCE). This conservative reform was partly inspired by the historical period of the semi-democratic Bourbon Restoration (1876–1931), and was criticised for not taking into account the social and political circumstances of the time.

The project coalesced into a proposal to reform three of the Fundamental Laws, but the exact changes would be determined by a mixed commission of the Government and the National Council of the Movement, as proposed by Torcuato Fernández-Miranda and Adolfo Suárez. The creation of the commission meant that Fraga and the reformists lost control of much of the legislative direction of the country; the reformists had been planning updated "Laws of Assembly and Association", which included a reform of the Spanish Criminal Code. Even so, the new Law of Assembly was passed by the Francoist Cortes on 25 May 1976, allowing public demonstration with government authorization. On the same day the Law of Political Associations was also approved, supported by Suárez, who affirmed in parliamentary session that "if Spain is plural, the Cortes cannot afford to deny it". Suárez's intervention in favor of this reform shocked many, including Juan Carlos I. This intervention was key in Juan Carlos' decision to appoint Suárez as Prime Minister in the following month.

The Arias-Fraga reform collapsed on 11 June, when the Cortes rejected changes to the Criminal Code, which had previously made it a crime to be affiliated with a political party other than FET y de las JONS. The members of the Cortes, who vehemently opposed the legalization of the Communist Party, added an amendment to the law that banned political organizations that "submitted to an international discipline" and "advocated for the implantation of a totalitarian regime". Javier Tusell pointed out that "those who in the past were in bed with totalitarianism now felt entitled to prohibit the totalitarianism of others". The reforms of the Fundamental Laws governing royal succession and the composition of the Cortes, designed by Fraga, also failed. Fraga had intended to make the Cortes bicameral, with one chamber elected by universal suffrage and the other having an "organic" character.

First government of Adolfo Suárez (July 1976 – June 1977) 

Torcuato Fernández-Miranda, the president of the Council of the Realm, placed Adolfo Suárez on a list of three candidates for King Juan Carlos to choose to become the new head of government, replacing Arias Navarro. The king chose Suárez because he felt he could meet the challenge of the difficult political process that lay ahead: persuading the Cortes, which was composed of appointed Francoist politicians, to dismantle Franco's system. In this manner, he would formally act within the Francoist legal system and thus avoid the prospect of military intervention in the political process. Suárez was appointed as the 138th Prime Minister of Spain by Juan Carlos on 3 July 1976, a move that, given his Francoist past, was opposed by leftists and some centrists.

As Prime Minister, Suárez quickly presented a clear political program based on two points:
 The development of a Law for Political Reform that, once approved by the Cortes and the Spanish public in a referendum, would open the constituent process for creating a liberal democracy in Spain.
 A call for democratic elections in June 1977 to elect a Cortes charged with drawing up a new democratic constitution

This program was clear and unequivocal, but its realization tested the political capacity of Suárez. He had to convince both the opposition to participate in his plan and the army to allow the process to run uninterrupted, and at the same time needed to bring the situation in the Basque Country under control.

Despite these challenges, Suárez's project was carried out without delay between July 1976 and June 1977. He had to act on many fronts during this short period of time in order to achieve his aims.

The draft of the Political Reform Act was written by Torcuato Fernández-Miranda, speaker of the Cortes, who handed it over to the Suárez government in July 1976. The project was approved by the Suarez Government in September 1976. To open the door to parliamentary democracy in Spain, this legislation could not simply create a new political system by eliminating the obstacles put in place by the Franco regime against democracy: it had to liquidate the Francoist system through the Francoist Cortes itself. The Cortes, under the presidency of Fernández-Miranda, debated this law throughout the month of November; it ultimately approved it, with 425 votes in favor, 59 against, and 13 abstentions.

The Suárez government sought to gain further legitimacy for the changes through a popular referendum. On 15 December 1976, with a 77.72% participation rate, 94% of voters indicated their support for the changes. From this moment, it was possible to begin the electoral process (the second part of the Suárez program), which would serve to elect the members of the Constituent Cortes, the body that was to be responsible for creating a democratic constitution.

With this part of his plan fulfilled, Suárez had to resolve another issue: should he include the opposition groups who had not participated at the beginning of the transition? Suárez also had to deal with a third problem: coming to terms with the anti-Francoist opposition.

Relations of the Suárez government with the opposition 
Suárez adopted a series of measured policies to add credibility to his project. He issued a partial political amnesty in July 1976, freeing 400 prisoners; he then extended this in March 1977, and finally granted a blanket amnesty in May of the same year. The right to strike was legalized in March 1977, with the right to unionize being granted the following month. Also in March, a new electoral law introduced the necessary framework for Spain's electoral system to be brought into accord with those of other countries that were liberal parliamentary democracies.

Through these and other measures of government, Suárez complied with the conditions that the opposition groups first demanded in 1974. These opposition forces met in November 1976 to create a platform of democratic organizations.

Suárez had initiated political contact with the opposition by meeting with Felipe González, secretary general of the Spanish Socialist Workers' Party (PSOE), in August 1976. The positive attitude of the socialist leader gave further support for Suárez to carry forward his political project, but everyone clearly perceived that the big problem for the political normalization of the country would be the legalization of the PCE, which at the time had more activists and was more organized than any other group in the political opposition. However, in a meeting between Suárez and the most important military leaders in September, the officers strongly declared opposition to the legalization of the PCE.

The PCE, for its part, acted ever more publicly to express its opinions. According to the Communists, the Law for Political Reform was anti-democratic and the elections for the Constituent Cortes should be called by a provisional government that formed part of the political forces of the opposition. The opposition did not show any enthusiasm for the Law for Political Reform. Suárez had to risk even more to involve the opposition forces in his plan.

In December 1976, the PSOE celebrated its 27th Congress in Madrid, and began to disassociate itself from the demands of the PCE, affirming that it would participate in the next call for elections for the Constituent Cortes. At the beginning of 1977, the year of the elections, Suárez confronted the problem of legalizing the PCE. After the public indignation aroused by the Massacre of Atocha in January 1977 against trade unionists and Communists, Suárez talked with PCE secretary-general Santiago Carrillo in February. Carrillo's willingness to cooperate without prior demands and his offer of a "social pact" for the period after the elections pushed Suárez to take the riskiest step of the transition: the legalization of the PCE in April 1977. The manner in which a unified trade union was strategically countered is an important feature of the Spanish transition, as it limited radical opposition and created the basis for a fractured industrial relations system.

Relations of the Suárez government with the Spanish army 
These forces could constitute an insurmountable obstacle if they brought about military intervention against political reform.

To resolve the issue, Suárez intended to support himself with a liberal group within the military, centered on General Díez Alegría. Suárez gave the members of this group the positions of authority with the most responsibility. The most notable personality of this faction within the army was General Manuel Gutiérrez Mellado. However, in July 1976, the Vice President for Defense Affairs was General Fernando de Santiago, a member of a hardline group within the army. De Santiago had shown his restlessness before, during the first amnesty in July 1976. He had opposed the law granting the right to unionize. Suárez dismissed Fernando de Santiago, nominating Gutiérrez Mellado instead. This confrontation with General de Santiago caused a large part of the army to oppose Suárez, opposition that further intensified when the PCE was legalized.

Suárez wanted to demonstrate to the army that the political normalization of the country meant neither anarchy nor revolution. In this, he counted on the cooperation of Santiago Carrillo, but he could in no way count on the cooperation of terrorist groups.

Resurgence of terrorist activity 

The Basque Country remained, for the better part of this period, in a state of political turbulence. Suárez granted a multi-stage amnesty for numerous Basque political prisoners, but the confrontations continued between local police and protesters. The separatist group ETA, which in the middle of 1976 had seemed open to a limited truce after Franco's death, resumed armed confrontation again in October. The time from 1978 to 1980 would be ETA's three deadliest years ever. However, it was between December 1976 and January 1977 that a series of attacks brought about a situation of high tension in Spain.

The Maoist GRAPO began its armed struggle by bombing public locations, and then continued with the kidnapping of two important figures of the regime: the President of the Council of the State José María de Oriol, and General Villaescusa, President of the Superior Council of the Military Justice. From the right, during these kidnappings, members of the neo-fascist  conducted the Atocha massacre, three of them labor lawyers, in an office on Atocha Street in Madrid, in January 1977.

In the midst of these provocations, Suárez convened his first meeting with a significant number of opposition leaders, who published a condemnation of terrorism and gave their support to Suárez's actions. During this turbulent time, the  capitalized on the instability and declared that the country was on the brink of chaos.

Despite the increased violence by the ETA and GRAPO, elections for the Constituent Cortes were carried out in June 1977.

First elections and the draft of the Constitution 

The elections held on 15 June 1977 confirmed the existence of four important political forces, at the national level.  The votes broke down in the following manner:
 Union of the Democratic Centre (UCD, Unión de Centro Democrático): 34.61%
 Spanish Socialist Workers' Party (PSOE, Partido Socialista Obrero Español): 29.27%
 Communist Party of Spain (PCE, Partido Comunista de España): 9.38%
 People's Alliance (AP, Alianza Popular): 8.33%

With the success of the Basque Nationalist Party (Basque: EAJ, Euzko Alderdi Jeltzalea; Spanish: PNV, Partido Nacionalista Vasco) and the Democratic Pact for Catalonia (PDC, Pacte Democrátic per Catalunya) in their respective regions, nationalist parties also began to show their political strength in these elections.

The Constituent Cortes (elected Spanish parliament) then began to draft a constitution, in the middle of 1977. In 1978, the Moncloa Pact was passed: an agreement amongst politicians, political parties, and trade unions to plan how to operate the economy, during the transition. The Spanish Constitution of 1978 went on to be approved in a referendum, on 6 December 1978.

Governments of the UCD 
Prime Minister Adolfo Suárez's party, the UCD, received a plurality, but not an absolute majority, in both the June 1977 and March 1979 elections. To exercise power, the UCD had to form parliamentary coalitions with other political parties. From 1979, the government spent much of its time working to hold together the many factions within the party itself, as well as their coalitions. In 1980, the Suárez government had, for the most part, accomplished its goal of a transition to democracy and lacked a further clear agenda. Many UCD members were fairly conservative and did not want further change. For example, a bill to legalize divorce caused much dissension inside the UCD, in spite of being supported by the majority of the populace. The UCD coalition fell apart.

The clashes among the several factions, inside the party, eroded Suárez's authority and his role as leader. The tension exploded in 1981: Suárez resigned as the head of government, and Leopoldo Calvo Sotelo was appointed, first to lead the new cabinet, and later, to the presidency of the UCD; social democrats led by Francisco Fernández Ordóñez defected from the coalition, later joining the PSOE, while Christian democrats left to form the People's Democratic Party.

While the democratic normalization had succeeded in convincing ETA (pm), the "political-military" faction of ETA, to abandon arms and enter parliamentary politics, it did not stop the continuation of terrorist attacks by ETA (m) ("ETA Military"; later simply "ETA") or to a lesser extent, GRAPO. Meanwhile, restlessness in various sections of the armed forces created fear of an impending military coup. Reactionary elements in the army attempted a coup known as 23-F, in which Lieutenant Colonel Antonio Tejero led an occupation by a group of Guardia Civil of the Congress of Deputies, on the afternoon of 23 February 1981. The coup leaders claimed to be acting in the king's name. However, early on the following morning, Juan Carlos gave a nationwide speech unequivocally opposing it, saying that "the Crown, symbol of the permanence and unity of the nation, will not tolerate, in any degree whatsoever, the actions or behavior of anyone attempting, through use of force, to interrupt the democratic process." The coup was broken later that day, but demonstrated the existence of insurrectionary elements within the army.

First government of Felipe González (1982–1986) 

Calvo Sotelo dissolved parliament and called for elections in October 1982. In the 1979 election, the UCD had achieved a plurality, but in 1982, it suffered a spectacular defeat with only 11 seats in the Parliament. The 1982 elections gave an absolute majority to the PSOE, which had already spent many years preparing its image of an alternative government.

At the 28th Congress of the PSOE in May 1979, secretary-general Felipe González resigned, rather than ally with the strong revolutionary elements that seemed to dominate the party.  A special congress was called that September, and realigned the party along more moderate lines, renouncing Marxism and allowing González to take charge once more.

Throughout 1982, the PSOE confirmed its moderate orientation and brought in the social democrats, who had just broken from the UCD.

Winning an absolute majority in parliament in two consecutive elections (1982 and 1986), and exactly half the seats in 1989, allowed the PSOE to legislate and govern without establishing pacts with the other parliamentary political forces. In this way, the PSOE could make laws to achieve the goals of its political program, "el cambio" ("the change"). At the same time, the PSOE led many local and regional administrations. This comfortable political majority allowed the PSOE to give the country a long period of tranquility and stability, after the intense years of the transition.

See also 

 Greek transition to democracy (Metapolitefsi)
 Chilean transition to democracy
 Portuguese transition to democracy
 Spanish 1977 Amnesty Law
 Spanish society after the democratic transition
 Turno pacífico
 Franquismo sociológico
 Constitution of Spain
 José Larrañaga Arenas

References

Bibliography 

 
 
 
 
 
 Josep Colomer. Game Theory and the Transition to Democracy. The Spanish Model, Edward Elgar, 1995 .
 Daniele Conversi. 'The smooth transition: Spain's 1978 Constitution and the nationalities question', National Identities, vol. 4, no 3, November 2002, pp. 223–244
 Richard Gunther ed. Politics, Society, and Democracy: The Case of Spain. Boulder, Co.: Westview.
 Paul Preston. The Triumph of Democracy in Spain. London: Routledge, 2001.
 Javier Tusell. Spain: From Dictatorship to Democracy. London: Blackwell, 2007.
 Historia de un Cambio (in Spanish). Retrieved on August 24, 2006.
 Gonzalo Garland. Spain: from Transition to modern times, Instituto de Empresa, 2010.
 José-Francisco Jiménez-Díaz & Santiago Delgado-Fernández -Editors-: Political Leadership in the Spanish Transition to Democracy (1975–1982). Nueva York: Nova Science Publishers, 2016 (Series: Political Leaders and Their Assessment).

External links 
 LOC Country Studies-Spain Post-Franco Era
 Voices of the Transition – A Political History of Spain, 1975–1982
 Spain: Dictatorship to Democracy and After, 1975–2007
 The economy during the transition 

 
1970s in Spain
1980s in Spain
Modern history of Spain
Legal history of Spain
Political history of Spain
Reform in Spain
Revolutions in Spain
1975 establishments in Spain
1982 disestablishments in Spain